Rembert may refer to:

People
Catharine Rembert (1905–1990), American artist
Reggie Rembert (born 1966), American football player 
Winfred Rembert (1945–2021), African-American artist 
Rembert Weakland (1927-2022), American Roman Catholic prelate

Places

United States
Rembert, Missouri
Rembert, South Carolina

Other uses
A variant spelling of Rimbert, a 9th-century German Roman Catholic bishop